Lina Chatkevičiūtė (born 1981) is a Lithuanian professional ballroom dancer. Her current partner is Donatas Vėželis.

In 2014, they won their first European title in standard show dance.

Awards 
In 2016 Lithuanian Sports department awarded Lina Chatkevičiūtė for merits in Lithuanian sport.

Personal life 
In 2014 Chatkevičiūtė married her dancing partner Donatas Vėželis.

References

External links 
Lina Chatkevičiūtė at WDSF

Lithuanian ballroom dancers
Living people
Lithuanian female dancers
1981 births
Place of birth missing (living people)
Competitors at the 2009 World Games